E supremi was a papal encyclical (On High) issued by Pope Pius X on October 4, 1903.  This was the first encyclical issued by the pontiff. He expressed his deep feelings of unworthiness by quoting the plight of Anselm of Canterbury.  The pope saw the current age as wracked with troubles and even thought that we had perhaps reached the end of days.  He fervently wished to administer to the spiritual needs of the day - emphasizing the Catholic position on marriage, education, respect for property, maintaining order and justice in the social classes.  He emphasized the great importance of educating priests and of maintaining the highest level of morals in seminarians.

External links 
 The English text of the E Supremi encyclical

Documents of Pope Pius X
Papal encyclicals
Religion and politics
1903 documents
1903 in Christianity
October 1903 events